Baroness Elisabeth of Wangenheim-Winterstein (16 January 191215 March 2010) was the wife of Charles Augustus, Hereditary Grand Duke of Saxe-Weimar-Eisenach, and the mother of Prince Michael, current head of the House of Saxe-Weimar-Eisenach.

Early life 
Baroness Elisabeth and her twin sister Baroness Dorothée were born on 16 January 1912 in Tübingen, Württemberg to Baron Othmar von Wangenheim-Winterstein and his wife, Baroness Maud von Trützschler zum Falkenstein. Her family lived in Thüringia at Behringen Castle.

Her mother died in childbirth in 1913, leaving a son, Baron Jobst von Wangenheim-Winterstein. As a young girl Elisabeth began training as a pianist in Hanover but was forced to end her studies, as the death of their mother left her widowed father in need of help on the family estate. Her education left her with a lifetime love of music, particularly Mozart, as well as a fondness for literature, which helped sustain her through difficult times.

Marriage and issue 
On 5 October 1944 at Wartburg Castle, Elisabeth was married to Charles Augustus, Hereditary Grand Duke of Saxe-Weimar-Eisenach, the eldest son and heir of Wilhelm Ernst, Grand Duke of Saxe-Weimar-Eisenach, and his wife, Princess Feodora of Saxe-Meiningen, Grand Duchess of Saxe-Weimar-Eisenach.

They had three children:
Princess Elisabeth of Saxe-Weimar-Eisenach, Duchess of Saxony (born Burgellern bei Bamberg, Scheßlitz 22 July 1945), married in Munich on 10 July 1981 to Mindert Diderik de Kant (born Leeuwarden, 6 August 1934). They divorced in 1983, without issue.
Prince Michael of Saxe-Weimar-Eisenach, Duke of Saxony (born Bamberg, 15 November 1946)
Princess Beatrice-Maria of Saxe-Weimar-Eisenach, Duchess of Saxony (born Bamberg, 11 March 1948), married in London on 9 December 1977 to Martin Charles Davidson (born London, 23 September 1940), and has a daughter.

Because all titles have been banned in Germany since the German Revolution of 1918–19, Charles never succeeded his father as Grand Duke of Saxe-Weimar-Eisenach; from the death of Charles's father in 1923, he and Elisabeth were by courtesy known as "Hereditary Grand Duke" and "Hereditary Grand Duchess". Charles served as the head of the House of Saxe-Weimar-Eisenach until his death in 1988.

Just before giving birth to their first child, the couple were forced to flee eastern Germany in the face of the approaching Soviet Red Army. They stayed with Ernst II, Prince of Hohenlohe-Langenburg, at Weikersheim Castle, but lost most of their extensive property and possessions; all that remained of their former fortune was a small car and a small number of personal possessions. A small part of their fortune (several million euros) was eventually recovered, as they were allowed to reclaim the property they lost from the Soviet occupancy through family lawyers and the German government; none of the family ever returned to Thüringia, however.

Later life 
Elisabeth and Charles eventually separated, but were never officially divorced. By this point, their children were all married and living away from home; consequently, Elisabeth was alone much of the time later in her life. She lived quietly in Munich for the last fourteen years of her life to be near her daughter Princess Elisabeth. Unlike her "more glamorous" children, Elisabeth largely stayed out of headlines during her lifetime.

Though her son remarked that Elisabeth was "a fighter" after she recovered from an accident, the doctors gave her very little chance of survival; she died on 15 March 2010 at the age of 98 in Munich. Her remains were interred at Wartburg Castle, where, according to her son, she had always had a very emotional bond and wanted it to be her final resting place.

Ancestry

References 

1912 births
2010 deaths
German baronesses
Hereditary Grand Duchesses of Saxe-Weimar-Eisenach
House of Saxe-Weimar-Eisenach
German twins